This is the list of cathedrals in Venezuela.

Roman Catholic 
Cathedrals of the Roman Catholic Church in Venezuela:
 Catedral de Nuestra Señora de la Corteza in Acarigua
 Cathedral of St. Christopher in Barcelona
 Cathedral of Our Lady of the Pillar in Barinas
 Cathedral of Our Lady of Mount Carmel in Barquisimeto
 Cathedral of Our Lady of the Rosary in Cabimas
 All Saints Cathedral in Calabozo
 Metropolitan Cathedral of St. Ann in Caracas
 Cathedral of St. John the Baptist in Carora
 Cathedral of St. Rose of Lima in Carúpano
 Cathedral of St. Thomas in Ciudad Bolívar
 Pro-Cathedral of Our Lady of Fatima in Ciudad Guayana
 Cathedral Basilica of St. Ann in Coro
 Metropolitan Cathedral of St. Agnes in Cumaná
 Cathedral of Our Lady of Perpetual Help in El Vigia
 Basílica Catedral Nuestra Señora de Coromoto in Guanare
 Catedral Nuestra Señora de Copacabana in Guarenas
 Our Lady of Mount Carmel Cathedral, Guasdualito
 Cathedral of St. Peter the Apostle in La Guaira
 Cathedral of St. Philip Neri in Los Teques
 Cathedral of Our Lady of Mount Carmel in Machiques
 Cathedral of Sts. Peter and Paul in Maracaibo
 Cathedral of Our Lady of the Assumption in Maracay
 Cathedral of Our Lady of the Assumption in La Asunción
 Cathedral of Our Lady of Mount Carmel in Maturín
 Cathedral Basilica of the Immaculate Conception in Mérida
 Cathedral of Mary Help of Christians in Puerto Ayacucho
 Cathedral of St. Joseph in Puerto Cabello
 Catedral of Our Lady of Coromoto in Punto Fijo
 Cathedral of the Immaculate Conception in San Carlos
 Cathedral of St. Christopher in San Cristóbal
 Cathedral of St. Philip the Apostle in San Felipe
 Cathedral of Our Lady of Mount Carmel in San Fernando de Apure
 Cathedral of St. Helen in Santa Elena de Uairén
 Cathedral of Our Lady of Peace in Trujillo
 Catedral de la Divina Pastora in Tucupita
 Cathedral Basilica of Our Lady of Help in Valencia
 Cathedral of Our Lady of Candelaria in Valle de la Pascua
 Cathedral of Our Lady of the Assumption in Maracay (Syriac Catholic)
 Cathedral of St. George in Caracas (Melkite Greek)

See also

List of cathedrals

References

Cathedrals in Venezuela
Venezuela
Cathedrals
Cathedrals